Jean Darcante, real name Jean-Louis Albassier, (1 April 1910 – 18 March 1990) was a French actor and theatre director. He was managing director of the théâtre de la Renaissance in Paris from 1946 to 1957.

Filmography

Actor 
1936: Girls of Paris (by Claude Vermorel) – Roland
1939: L'Étrange nuit de Noël (by Yvan Noé) – Roger
1942: La Symphonie fantastique (by Christian-Jaque) – Prosper Mérimée (uncredited)
1942: Le Destin fabuleux de Désirée Clary (by Sacha Guitry) – Duphot
1946: Vive la liberté (by Jeff Musso)
1946: Martin Roumagnac (by Georges Lacombe) – L'avocat de la défense
1953: Flukt fra paradiset (by Toralf Sandø) – Trekkspilleren
1959: Two Men in Manhattan (by Jean-Pierre Melville) – Rouvier (final film role)

Dubbing 
1940: Jud Süß – Aktuarius Faber (Malte Jäger)

Theatre 
Comedian
1934: Les Races by Ferdinand Bruckner, mise en scène Raymond Rouleau, Théâtre de l'Œuvre 
1943: Cristobal by Charles Exbrayat, mise en scène Jean Darcante, Théâtre Montparnasse
1961: Le Misanthrope de Molière, mise en scène Jean Meyer, Théâtre du Palais-Royal

Theatre director
1943: Cristobal by Charles Exbrayat, Théâtre Montparnasse
1944: Un Don Juan by Michel Aucouturier, Comédie des Champs-Élysées 
1946: Quatre Femmes by Marcel Mouloudji, théâtre de la Renaissance
1946: L'Herbe d'erreur after Rémy Bordez, adaptation Jean Variot, mise en scène Jean Darcante, théâtre de la Renaissance
1950: Ce soir à Samarcande by Jacques Deval, théâtre de la Renaissance
1952: Madame Filoumé by Eduardo De Filippo, théâtre de la Renaissance
1954: Rope by Patrick Hamilton, adaptation Gabriel Arout, théâtre de la Renaissance
1954: Il pleut bergère by René Wheeler, théâtre de la Renaissance
1954: Bel-Ami by Frédéric Dard after Guy de Maupassant, théâtre de la Renaissance
1955: Monsieur chasse de Georges Feydeau, mise en scène Jean Darcante, théâtre de la Renaissance

Bibliography 
 Jean Darcante, À l'enseigne d'un Dieu malin, Michel Brient éditeur, Paris, 1959.
 Jean Darcante, Théâtre, la grande aventure, éditions du Sorbier, 1985.

References

External links 
 
 Sa fiche sur Les.Archives du spectacle

French male stage actors
French male film actors
French theatre directors
Male actors from Paris
1910 births
1990 deaths